Hydrovatus castaneus, is a species of predaceous diving beetle found in India, Myanmar, Indonesia, Sri Lanka, Bangladesh, and China.

References 

Dytiscidae
Insects of Sri Lanka
Insects described in 1855